Philip Naviasky (14 January 1894 – 19 June 1983) was an English artist based in Leeds. He specialised in watercolour and oil painting.

Born in Leeds to Polish-Jewish immigrant parents Barnet Naviasky (born Berel Neviazhsky) and Fanny (née Levinson), he won a scholarship to the Leeds School of Fine Arts in 1907. In 1912, he was the youngest ever student accepted into the Royal Academy school. He went on to win a Royal Exhibition award and to study at the Royal College of Art, after which he spent his career in Leeds as an artist and art teacher at Leeds College of Art.

References

1894 births
1983 deaths
British male painters
20th-century British painters
Artists from Leeds
20th-century British male artists